This is a list of historical events and publications of Australian literature during 2021.

Major publications

Literary fiction 

 Evelyn Araluen, Dropbear
 Larissa Behrendt, After Story
Steven Carroll, O
 Nikki Gemmell, The Ripping Tree
 Anita Heiss, Bila Yarrudhanggalangdhuray: River of Dreams
 John Kinsella, Pushing Back
 Emily Maguire, Love Objects
Alice Pung, One Hundred Days

Collected essays 

 Chelsea Watego, Another Day in the Colony

Children's and young adult fiction 
 Felicity Castagna, Girls in Boys' Cars
 Katrina Nannestad, Rabbit, Soldier, Angel Thief

Crime and thrillers 

 Helen FitzGerald, Ash Mountain
Michael Robotham, When You Are Mine

Poetry 

 Pam Brown, Stasis Shuffle
 Maxine Beneba Clarke, How Decent Folk Behave
 Andy Jackson, Human Looking
 Maria Takolander, Trigger Warning

Non-fiction 

 Randa Abdel-Fattah, Coming of Age in the War on Terror
Julia Banks, Power Play: Breaking Through Bias, Barriers and Boys' Clubs
Alison Croggon, Monsters: A reckoning
Mehreen Faruqi, Too Migrant, Too Muslim, Too Loud
Ross Garnaut, Reset: Restoring Australia after the Pandemic Recession
Stan Grant, With the Falling of the Dusk
Dale Kent, The Most I Could Be
Scott Ludlam, Full Circle: A search for the world that comes next
Mark McKenna, Return to Uluru
 Henry Reynolds, Truth-Telling: History, sovereignty and the Uluru Statement
 Jeff Sparrow, Crimes Against Nature: Capitalism and Global Heating
 Corey Tutt and Blak Douglas (illustrator), The First Scientists: Deadly Inventions and Innovations from Australia’s First Peoples

Awards and honours

Note: these awards were presented in the year in question.

Lifetime achievement

Fiction

National

Children and Young Adult

National

Non-Fiction

Poetry

Drama

Deaths

 1 May – Kate Jennings, poet and writer (died in the United States) (b. 1948)
 25 April – Valerie Parv, romance novelist (b. 1951)
16 May – Vera Deacon, historian (b. 1926)
16 September – Tim Thorne, poet (b. 1944)
22 November –
 Stuart Macintyre, historian (b. 1947)
Doug MacLeod, children's writer, poet, screenwriter and playwright (b. 1959)
 Babette Smith, historian (b. 1942)
26 November – Desmond O'Grady, journalist and author (died in Rome) (b. 1929)
26 December – Paul B. Kidd, radio broadcaster and true crime writer (b. 1945)

See also
 Literature
 List of years in Australian literature
 List of Australian literary awards

References

Literature
Australian literature by year
Years of the 21st century in Australia
Years of the 21st century in literature